Seton Catholic High School is a private, Roman Catholic high school in Richmond, Indiana.  It is part of the Roman Catholic Diocese of Indianapolis.

The original Catholic high school in Richmond (St. Andrew) operated from 1899 to 1936 at the same location as Seton Catholic today, which opened in 2002. In 2009, Seton Catholic added a new gym to its campus, The Chuck Mosey Memorial Gymnasium.

See also
 List of high schools in Indiana

References

External links
 School Website

Roman Catholic Archdiocese of Indianapolis
Catholic secondary schools in Indiana
Private high schools in Indiana
Educational institutions established in 2002
Schools in Wayne County, Indiana
Buildings and structures in Richmond, Indiana
Private middle schools in Indiana
2002 establishments in Indiana
Education in Richmond, Indiana